Nuclear Death was an American death metal band formed in 1986 in Phoenix, Arizona. They were a very early example of a band in the extreme metal genre with a female vocalist, Lori Bravo.

Their style, which drummer Joel Whitfield described as "deathrashardcorextreme music", was compared to bands like Repulsion and Scum-era Napalm Death.

Biography 
Nuclear Death were formed on March 23, 1986, by Lori Bravo (vocals, bass guitar), Phil Hampson (guitar), and Joel Whitfield (drums) while they were in high school. Nuclear Death cited Venom, Motörhead, The Plasmatics, Witchfinder General, and Discharge as their influences. Their first demo, Wake Me When I'm Dead, was released later that same year, receiving positive reviews from American and overseas zines. They were notable as at the time very few death metal artists had female singers. Their second demo, Welcome to the Minds of the Morbid, followed in 1987, on the back of which Nuclear Death signed a contract with Richard Campos from Wild Rags, a record label, fanzine and record dealer in California.

In 1991, the band released their more controversial work, entitled Carrion for Worm, containing many songs considered to be in bad taste, such as "The Human Seed", "Lurker in the Closet: A 'Fairy' Tale", and "Greenflies". Carrion for Worm featured vocals by Chris Reifert, singer from popular death metal band Autopsy, on two songs, "Cathedral of Sleep" and "Vampirism".

On May 23, 1992, Nuclear Death played a notorious concert in Puerto Rico, with label partners Impetigo. Later that year they released For Our Dead, a four-track single containing a rerecorded version of 1987's "The Third Antichrist" from Welcome to the Minds of the Morbid.

After the break-up of Nuclear Death, Lori went on to form a new band, Raped, in 2002. Joel Whitfield joined Eroticide in 1991. After leaving the band in 1992, Phil was in Eroticide (1996 to 1998), and Whorror (2000 to 2002). In late 2013, Phil started Feral Viscera. He currently continues to record as Feral Viscera, but  decided to re-form Whorror (along with original vocalist Donn Sullivan and original drummer, Mike Wyatt (Genocaust).

Recognition 
Nuclear Death's 1990 debut album Bride of Insect was listed in Decibel magazine "Hall of Fame" as entry No. 90. The entry says:

Members 
Last known lineup
 Lori Bravo – vocals, bass, guitar (1986–2000)

Past members
 Joel Whitefield – drums (1986–1990)
 Phil Hampson – guitar (1986–1992)
 Steve Cowen – drums, keyboards (1990–1996)

Discography 

 1988 – Caveat cassette tape
 1990 – Bride of Insect LP (Wild Rags)
 1991 – Carrion for Worm LP (Wild Rags)
 1992 – For Our Dead EP/cassette tape (Wild Rags)
 1992 – All Creatures Great and Eaten cassette tape
 1996 – The Planet Cachexial CD (Cat's Meow Records)
 2000 – Harmony Drinks of Me CD (Cat's Meow Records)

DVDs 
 ???? – Unalive in Texas VHS
 ???? – The Profligacy Video VHS

References

External links 
 
 Bride of Insect/Carrion for Worm review on Vampire Magazine
 Bride of Insect/Carrion for Worm review on VS Webzine

American death metal musical groups
Musical groups established in 1986
Musical groups disestablished in 2000
Musical groups from Phoenix, Arizona
Heavy metal musical groups from Arizona
Musical quartets
1986 establishments in Arizona